Tommy Alexander Smith (born August 1, 1948 in Albemarle, North Carolina) is a former Major League Baseball outfielder. He played five seasons in the majors, four for the Cleveland Indians and one for the Seattle Mariners, mostly in the outfield.

Smith attended Lincoln High School and North Carolina State University, where he played college baseball for the Wolfpack. In 1969, he played collegiate summer baseball with the Bourne Canalmen of the Cape Cod Baseball League and was named a league all-star.

Smith was selected by the Indians in the third round of the 1970 Major League Baseball Draft. He spent the next several seasons in their farm system, seeing only brief stints with the major league club in each season from 1973 until 1975. In 1976, Smith got his first real shot at big league playing time, playing 55 games and batting .256.

Prior to the 1977 season, Smith was selected with the 58th pick (third round) of the 1976 MLB expansion draft by the Mariners. However, with the expansion team Smith saw very little time in the majors, playing in just 21 games, going 7-for-27 in his final major league season.

References

External links

Major League Baseball outfielders
Cleveland Indians players
Seattle Mariners players
Sumter Indians players
Savannah Indians players
Jacksonville Suns players
Miami Amigos players
Elmira Pioneers players
Oklahoma City 89ers players
Toledo Mud Hens players
Rochester Red Wings players
Bourne Braves players
Baseball players from North Carolina
NC State Wolfpack baseball players
1948 births
Living people
People from Albemarle, North Carolina
American expatriate baseball players in Italy